Melissa Nawa (born 23 October 1991) is the first female professional golfer in Zambia. She started playing golf at the age of six. She has won several tournaments around Africa. Her father and trainer, Stephen Nawa, and younger sister, Tina Nawa, are also professional golfers. She currently lives in the United States.

Education 
For her secondary school education, Nawa went to Mary Queen of Peace High School in Zambia. Nawa later went to Alabama State University.

Career achievements

Golf Academy 
In 2014, Melissa and her sister formed Nawa Girls Golf Academy. The aim of the academy is to teach girls from underprivileged backgrounds the sport of golf.

References

Zambian female golfers
1991 births
Living people